Sanjith Hegde is an Indian playback singer from Bangalore, Karnataka. Sanjith Hegde has rendered film songs in several Indian languages and has several chart hits to his credit. He has sung songs in Kannada, Tamil, Telugu and Hindi. His rendition of "Gunu Gunuguva" from the film Dalapathi composed by Charan Raj topped the music charts for a year. Sanjith won the Gaana Mirchi Music Award for the Best Upcoming Male Vocalist for the song "Kush Kush" from the movie Chamak composed by Judah Sandhy.

Career 
Sanjith Hegde became popular after participating in the Kannada singing reality show Sa Re Ga Ma Pa – Season 13, judged by Rajesh Krishnan, Vijay Prakash and Arjun Janya, broadcast on Zee Kannada. Following which Sanjith also participated in Sa Re Ga Ma Pa – Seniors, judged by Karthik, Vijay Prakash and Srinivas, which was broadcast on Zee Tamil.

Sanjith made his singing debut in the Kannada Film Industry with the song 'Gunu Gunuguva' from the film Dalapathi composed by Charan Raj in 2017. Sanjith made his Tamil debut in the film Kalakalappu 2 with the song 'Thaarumaaru' and Telugu debut in the film Krishnarjuna Yudham with the song 'I Wanna Fly' in 2018. Sanjith's popularity as an individual artist and as a playback singer grew after that juncture, with a number of popular new songs.

Sanjith Hegde has also performed live in various cities in India and abroad.

Awards and nominations 
 2018: Nominated for SIIMA Award for Best Playback Singer (Male) for "Kush Kush".
 2018: Won the Gaana Mirchi Music Award for Best Upcoming Male Vocalist. 
 2019: Won the Kannada International Music Academy Award for Best Playback Singer Male – Film Music.
 2019: Nominated for SIIMA Award for Best Playback Singer (Male) for "Shaakuntle Sikkalu".
2019:Won - Filmfare Award for Best Playback Singer (Male) - Kannada - "Shaakuntle Sikkalu"- Naduve Antaravirali
 2021: Nominated for SIIMA Award for Best Playback Singer (Male) for "HanuManKind".

Filmography

Discography

References

External links

Sanjith Hegde's performance at Mirchi Music awards South 2018
'Shaakuntle Sikkalu' sung by Sanjith Hegde
'Hinde Hinde Hogu' sung by Sanjith Hegde
Sanjith Hegde Songs on Gaana
Sanjith Hegde Albums 
Sanjith Hegde Songs on Saavn 
Sanjith Hegde Songs on Hungama 
Sanjith Hegde Songson Spotify 
Sanjith hegde Songson Apple Music 
Sanjith Hegde wins Mirchi Music Award

Indian male playback singers
Living people
Kannada playback singers
Singers from Bangalore
Tamil playback singers
Year of birth missing (living people)